Trigga is the sixth studio album by American singer Trey Songz. It was released on July 1, 2014, by Songbook and Atlantic Records. The album serves as the follow-up to the singer's fifth studio album Chapter V (2012). Trey Songz enlisted a variety of record producers such as DJ Mustard, Mike Will Made It, Da Internz, Soundz, Dun Deal, The Featherstones, D'Mile and The Insomniakz, among others.

Musically, Trigga is a hip hop-influenced R&B album, with its topics focusing on promiscuity and infidelity. The album was met with positive reviews from critics, who praised Trigga's musicality and brazenness. The album fared well commercially, debuting at number one on the US Billboard 200. The album was supported by six official singles: "Na Na", "SmartPhones", "Foreign", "Change Your Mind", "What's Best for You", and "Touchin, Lovin" featuring Nicki Minaj. Trigga has been available in a repackaged version, titled Trigga Reloaded, as of June 2015.

Background
On February 15, 2014, Trey Songz announced that the title to his sixth studio album would be called Trigga and announced it would be released on June 30, 2014. Talking about the album the singer said: "My album is very unapologetic, but at the same time, it’s real. And when I do speak about love, you feel the emotion there, whether I’m joyous about it or not, it’s still emotion. And I think that’s what music is, is emotion". When asked about Triggas lyrical content being different from the average R&B album in regards to love he stated: 

 Music and lyrics 
Trigga is a hip hop-influenced R&B album. According to Iyana Robertson of Vibe, the album finds the singer "in the most brash musical space of his career". Andy Kellman of AllMusic said that the persona portrayed by Songz on Trigga "relishes his playboy status more than ever, boasting about a multitude of behavioral stunts". Spins reviewer Anupa Mistry said that the album succeeded into representing sonically and lyrically the merge of R&B and hip hop that was happening during that period, that was carried by other artists such as Chris Brown and Drake.

Singles
On January 21, 2014, Songz released a song, titled "Na Na" as the album's first official single. The music video for "Na Na" was released on March 12. The song peaked at number 21 on the US Billboard Hot 100.

On April 1, 2014, Songz released a song, called "SmartPhones" as the album's second official single. The music video for "SmartPhones" was released on May 10.

"Foreign" and "Change Your Mind" were released as the album's third and fourth singles respectively on May 13, 2014. The music video for "Foreign" was released on June 16. The music video for "Change Your Mind" was released on June 24.

"What's Best for You" was released as the album's fifth single on June 2, 2014. On August 19, 2014, the music video was released for "What's Best For You". The song peaked at number one on the Billboard Adult R&B Songs, number 21 on the Billboard R&B/Hip-Hop Airplay, and number 20 on the Billboard Hot R&B Songs charts.

"Touchin, Lovin", featuring Nicki Minaj, was sent to US urban radio as the album's sixth single on September 9, 2014. On January 5, 2015, the music video was released for "Touchin Lovin" featuring Nicki Minaj.

"Ordinary", featuring Jeezy, was previously released as a promo-only single on April 22, 2014, but did not making on the album.

Critical reception

Trigga was met with positive reviews from music critics. At Metacritic, which assigns a normalized rating out of 100 to reviews from critics, the album received an average score of 68, which indicates "generally positive reviews", based on 9 reviews. Andy Kellman of AllMusic said, "This is, no doubt, one of the most flagrantly lecherous commercial R&B albums of its time. It also has sharp hooks and slick productions to spare." Anupa Mistry of Spin stated, "Trigga ... [is] a sublime, soulful convergence of the sonic minimalism and oil-slicked synths of today's hip-hop and R&B (courtesy, mostly, of Young Thug and Migos-famous producer Dun Deal), and its sound provides a charismatic contrast to its almost anhedonic pursuit of pleasure." Paul MacInnes of The Guardian said, "It might all feel a little mechanical, but Trigga does hang together, and has a seductive power that (one presumes) is befitting of the man himself." Matt Fruchtman of Slant Magazine stated, "At times, Songz's lyrics venture into personal territory: "Y.A.S. (You Ain't Shit)" displays both genuine self-loathing and anger that's a stark contrast to the arrogant persona featured throughout the bulk of the album. This kind of vulnerability is refreshing, but Trigga is otherwise designed like a Hollywood blockbuster: squandered talent, obvious themes, and fleeting moments of creative excellence that stick among the clichés."

Martín Caballero of USA Today said, "Trey Songz's engaging sixth album, Trigga, is a statement of intent — not of a bold new direction, but rather of the singer's determination to solidify the hitmaker's pedigree he's worked hard to earn." Julia LeConte of Now stated, "Trigga is smooth and singable, with its share of gems. "Change Your Mind" is the most initially catchy (in that vanilla, Jason Derülo way) and "Foreign (Remix)" begs for repeat spins." Erin Lowers of XXL said, "Filled with lust, desire and sexual journeys, Trey Songz reaches an expected level of mainstream success with Trigga, and while safe is always encouraged during sexual acts, perhaps Trey could’ve taken a few more risks with this album." Marcus Dowling of HipHopDX found his vocal performance on the record "irrepressibly pleasing", stating that "his delivery makes the simplistic and direct tone of his songwriting stand out".

Commercial performance
The album debuted at number one on the Billboard 200, with first-week sales of 105,000 copies in the United States. The album spent an additional two weeks in the chart's top ten. As of October 2014, the album had sold 264,000 copies. The release of Trigga Reloaded prompted the album's return to the album chart at number 23 for the week of July 11, 2015 with 17,000 equivalent album units; it sold 8,000 copies that week, with the remainder of its unit total reflecting the album's streaming activity and track sales. The album made its chart debut in the United Kingdom where it debuted at number seventeen on the UK Albums Chart and number one on the UK R&B Albums Chart. In July 2016, the album was certified platinum for combined sales and streaming equivalent units of over a million units in the United States.

In 2014, Trigga was ranked as the 58th most popular album of the year on the Billboard 200.

Track listing

 Trigga Reloaded Trigga Reloaded is the reissue of American singer and songwriter Trey Songz' sixth studio album, Trigga. It was released on June 23, 2015, by Songbook and Atlantic Records. Released eleven months after the original, Trigga Reloaded features five newly recorded songs.

Preceding the reissue's release was the lead single, "Slow Motion"; which reached number 26 on the US Billboard Hot 100. To push the album further, Songz performed and appeared at several high-profile events across the United States. The second single, "About You"; was then released on May 18, 2015. During the following week of the re-release, Trigga rose to number 23 on the US Billboard 200, selling 17,000 copies.

Background
Soon after releasing Trigga, the singer continued to make music that according to him kept the "vibe" of the music that he created for the previous project, working on it with the same mindset, so instead of developing it for a new project he wanted to "incorporate it to the expericence" of the Trigga album, updating it with a version called Trigga Reloaded.

Songz announced the reissue's release on February 2015 with an Instagram post.

Singles
The lead single from the reissued album, "Slow Motion" was released on January 20, 2015. The production on the song was handled by Charlie Puth and Geoffro Cause. The song has reached at number 26 on the US Billboard Hot 100.

The second single from the reissued album, "About You" was released on May 18, 2015. It was written and produced by Mark Nilan, Jr., alongside the productions to this song by 21 Music.

Track listing

Charts

Weekly charts

Year-end charts

Certifications

See also
List of Billboard 200 number-one albums of 2014

References

2014 albums
Trey Songz albums
Albums produced by D'Mile
Albums produced by Da Internz
Albums produced by DJ Mustard
Albums produced by Mike Free
Albums produced by Mike Will Made It